Noonday Creek Structure Number 4 is an earthen dam on Noonday Creek regulated by the Georgia Safe Dams Program, located west of Noonday Creek Park. Construction was completed in 1954.

Dimensions 

References

Buildings and structures in Cobb County, Georgia
Dams in Georgia (U.S. state)